Antonio Denti (Parma, 29 November 1990) is an Italian rugby union player.
His usual position is as a Hooker or Prop and he currently plays for Viadana in Top12.

For 2011–12 Celtic League season, he played for Aironi in the Pro 12 league. 

In 2009 and 2010, Denti was also named in the Italy Under 20.

References

External links 
It's Rugby English Profile 
Eurosport Profile

Sportspeople from Parma
Italian rugby union players
1990 births
Living people
Rugby union props
Rugby Viadana players
Aironi players